A History of Ireland in 100 Objects was a joint project by The Irish Times, the National Museum of Ireland, and the Royal Irish Academy to define one hundred archaeological or cultural objects that are important in the history of Ireland. The objects are single man-made artefacts or documents, excluding buildings, ranging in date from about 5,000 BC (Mesolithic) to the early 21st century. Most of the objects are held in accessible collections in the Republic of Ireland or Northern Ireland.

Details of the hundred objects, written by Irish Times journalist Fintan O'Toole, were initially serialized in The Irish Times between February 2011 and January 2013. In February 2013 a book about the hundred objects written by O'Toole, entitled A History of Ireland in 100 Objects, was published, and it quickly became a best-seller with 35,000 free downloads.

In January 2017 An Post announced that a selection of the 100 objects would form the subjects for the 9th definitive postage stamp series for Ireland, to be issued over a period of five or six years from 2017. The first set of stamps featuring twelve of the objects were issued in January 2017, consisting of eight different SOAR (Stamps on a Roll) stamps with various values (€0.05 to €7.50), a range coil stamps, and a national (N) and an international (W) rate stamp booklet.

List of Objects
Objects for which there is a specific Wikipedia article are given in bold type.

See also
 A History of the World in 100 Objects

Further reading

References

External links

 A History of Ireland in 100 Objects, a selection (1-95 complete)
 A History of Ireland in 100 Objects: Follow the Trail

Historiography of Ireland
Historical objects